Ricardo Javier Viveros Kilman (born 21 April 1975) is a former Chilean footballer.

Career
He played for clubs like Colo-Colo, Universidad de Concepción and Argentinos Juniors.

Following his retirement, he worked for Universidad de Concepción both as coach of the youth ranks and the assistant coach of Yuri Fernández. In August 2019, he assumed as the head coach of Nacimiento CSDC in the Chilean Tercera B.

Personal life
He is the nephew of the Chilean former international footballer Gustavo Viveros and the cousin of the also former footballer Juan Francisco Viveros.

Honours

Club
Universidad de Concepción
 Copa Chile (1): 2008–09

References

External links
 Profile at BDFA 
 
 Ricardo Vveros at PlaymakerStats

1975 births
Living people
Chilean footballers
Chilean expatriate footballers
C.D. Huachipato footballers
Deportes Temuco footballers
Argentinos Juniors footballers
Colo-Colo footballers
O'Higgins F.C. footballers
Universidad de Concepción footballers
Primera B de Chile players
Chilean Primera División players
Argentine Primera División players
Chilean expatriate sportspeople in Argentina
Expatriate footballers in Argentina
Association football forwards
Chilean football managers